Arbolí is a municipality in the comarca of the Baix Camp in Catalonia, Spain. It is situated in the west of the comarca in the Prades mountains. A local road links the village with the C-242 road.

The Prades Mountains are located in the vicinity of this municipality.

Demography

Note 
 Arbolí became part of the Baix Camp in the comarcal revision of 1990: previously it formed part of the Priorat.

References

 Panareda Clopés, Josep Maria; Rios Calvet, Jaume; Rabella Vives, Josep Maria (1989). Guia de Catalunya, Barcelona: Caixa de Catalunya.  (Spanish).  (Catalan).

External links 
Official website 
 Government data pages 

Municipalities in Baix Camp
Populated places in Baix Camp